Khavaran (formerly, Khaneh Kahdan (Persian: خانِگَهدان and خانه کَهدان), also Romanized as Khāneh Kāhdān, Khānegahdān, Khānehkohdān, Khāneh-ye Kahdān, Khāneh-ye Kāhvān, Khānekahdān, and Khānkahdān) is a city and capital of Khafr District, in Jahrom County, Fars Province, Iran.  At the 2006 census, its population was 5,137, in 1,303 families.

References

Populated places in  Jahrom County
Khafr County

Cities in Fars Province